Bernhard Quandt (14 April 1903, in Rostock – 2 August 1999, in Schwerin) was a German politician (SPD, KPD, SED).

He was Minister-President of Mecklenburg (GDR in 1951/52 and the First Secretary of the SED in Schwerin until 1952.

He was a member of the SPD from 1920 to 1923 and after that of the KPD. Later he was a member of the Staatsrat of the GDR and the Central Committee of the SED.

External links 

 Schwabe, K.: Nachlass Bernhard Quandt im Landeshauptarchiv Schwerin. archivar 55 (2004) Nr. 4, S. 328-330
 (mp3)

1903 births
1999 deaths
People from Rostock
People from the Grand Duchy of Mecklenburg-Schwerin
Social Democratic Party of Germany politicians
Communist Party of Germany politicians
Members of the Central Committee of the Socialist Unity Party of Germany
Members of the State Council of East Germany
Members of the 1st Volkskammer
Members of the 3rd Volkskammer
Members of the 4th Volkskammer
Members of the 5th Volkskammer
Members of the 6th Volkskammer
Members of the 7th Volkskammer
Members of the 8th Volkskammer
Members of the 9th Volkskammer
Ministers-President of Mecklenburg-Western Pomerania
University of Rostock alumni
Sachsenhausen concentration camp survivors
Recipients of the Patriotic Order of Merit (honor clasp)
Recipients of the Banner of Labor